{{Infobox concert 
| concert_tour_name = Beautiful Garbage World Tour
| image             = Beautifulgarbagetourposter.jpg
| image_size        = 250
| landscape         = 
| alt               = 
| image_caption     = 
| artist            = Garbage
| type              = World
| album             = Beautiful Garbage
| start_date        = October 10, 2001
| end_date          = December 10, 2002
| number_of_legs    = 11
| number_of_shows   = 72 in North America  40 in Europe  12 in Oceania  4 in Asia  1 in Caribbean  129 total
| last_tour         = Version 2.0 World Tour(1998–1999)
| this_tour         = Beautiful Garbage World Tour(2001–2002)
| next_tour         = Bleed Like Me World Tour(2005)
}}

The Beautiful Garbage World Tour was the third world concert tour cycle by American/Scottish alternative rock group Garbage, which took the band throughout North and Central America, Europe, Japan, Australia and New Zealand in support of its third album Beautiful Garbage.

The Beautiful Garbage tour takes in headline performances, support performances for U2, Red Hot Chili Peppers and No Doubt, and slots at rock festivals and radio shows around the world. A number of notable acts supported Garbage throughout the run of the tour, including White Stripes, Kelli Ali, Queen Adreena and Abandoned Pools.

The tour was hampered by problems with the health of the band, with singer Shirley Manson suffering from throat problems and drummer Butch Vig being taken off sick twice, first with Hepatitis A and then with Bell's palsy. While some shows that Manson could not perform were cancelled, Vig was replaced at first with Matt Chamberlain and then with Matt Walker, to prevent disruption to the tour dates.

Itinerary
Garbage marked the release of Beautiful Garbage by performing an in-store set in Chicago's Virgin Megastore on October 2, 2001. Garbage began touring the album as the opening act on the third leg of U2's Elevation Tour from October 12 in South Bend, Indiana, into Canada and through to 24th in New York City. Prior the last show, Vig collapsed from the effects of food poisoning and contracting Hepatitis A. Rather than cancelling the scheduled shows, Garbage recruited Matt Chamberlain to replace Vig for the remainder of the year. Garbage performed a series of underplayed headlining shows in Europe during November, beginning in Trondheim, Norway and ending in London, United Kingdom, on November 14. Garbage then returned to North America for the final Elevation tour Southern State shows, from Kansas City, Missouri on the 27th through to the last show in Miami, Florida on December 2. At the last show, U2 drummer Larry Mullen, Jr. played drums on "Only Happy When It Rains". Garbage wrapped up 2001 by performing at the Not So Silent Night radio festival in Los Angeles.

The Beautiful Garbage tour started in earnest in January 2002 in New Zealand and Australia, when Garbage joined the Big Day Out rock festival. In between the festival shows, Garbage headlined two concerts in Melbourne and Sydney. Garbage then spent ten days in Japan, performing four headline shows in Osaka and Tokyo.

Garbage launched a headline UK tour on April 1 in Portsmouth, a run that included an acoustic performance in Edinburgh and headlining MTV's 5 Night Stand. The band were supported on the UK dates by Kelli Ali. Beyond the UK, the run extended to a number of shows in Cologne, Amsterdam and Bourges. On April 19, Garbage returned to play a six-week itinerary of North American dates. Beginning in Toronto, the tour was routed down the Eastern Coast of America, over to the Midwest and then onto the West Coast. The jaunt ended with two night stint in Los Angeles. Garbage are supported by Abandoned Pools and on some shows, by White Stripes; during the tour, Vig is taken ill (later diagnosed as Bell's Palsy) and is replaced again by Matt Chamberlain. Garbage wrapped the North American tourdates on June 6 in Mexico City.

A month-long European trek began June 10 in Madrid, covering major rock festivals including Glastonbury and Roskilde. Matt Walker stood in for Vig for the rest of the summer. Garbage perform two shows in Nice and Lyon supporting Red Hot Chili Peppers, and a further two headlining French shows in Lille and Paris with Mercury Rev as support. The European leg ended at Espárrago Rock in Spain on July 12. Throughout the run, Manson is dogged by vocal problems, with her voice giving in at Roskilde, and leading to the cancellation of a few festival appearances. After a six-week break, Garbage return to the United Kingdom to perform their last European shows of the year – two intimate club gigs in London.

With Vig rejoining the ranks following his recovery period, Garbage headed to Australia to perform at the four date M-One festival across the country at the beginning of October. Garbage then joined No Doubt, who were promoting their Rock Steady album, to co-headline a trek around the United States. Support came from The Distillers. Kicking off on October 15 in West Kingston, Rhode Island, the tour was route down the Eastern Seaboard, and into Southern States before heading to the Pacific Northwest region and onto the American Southwest. The tour ended on November 27 in Long Beach, California.

Garbage went on to perform one further show, in George Town, Grand Cayman. Degree flew 200 competition winners to the Cayman Islands for a beachside Garbage concert. One competition winner was matched with a local for an episode of the reality show Blind Date and both got to meet the band.

Broadcast and recordingsGarbage: Live at Eagles Ballroom 2002 was a long-form live video DVD planned for release in 2002 by Garbage to document the North American leg of the Beautiful Garbage tour, utilizing footage shot on May 11, 2002 at the Eagles Ballroom in Milwaukee, Wisconsin. The footage likely went unreleased because the band's worldwide record label Mushroom Records UK was wound down before it was sold to Warner Music label EastWest in early 2003. An entry for the DVD release was included on the band's official website discography in April 2005; while Director Kenneth A. LaBarre uploaded a rough cut of "Special" to his YouTube channel on January 3, 2007. The video was an outtake from a 5-song demo DVD that LaBarre submitted to the band and their management at Q Prime in June 2002.

The origin of the DVD came from a pitch to the band and the band's management made by friend Author Jim Berkenstadt who along with LaBarre thought the band would be interested in recording a hometown concert for release, or archive for future use. The material would be owned and controlled by the band, unlike footage from previous TV appearances. The approach that LaBarre proposed, with the help of DP Bruce Johnson, was to create a "low impact, high quality digital video" document of the show using a mix of the latest Canon DV cameras and avoid using any cranes, jibs or mobile production trucks to maintain a small footprint and low budget. The footage was shot using eight cameras total. Two Canon Elura cameras with wide angle lenses were placed in and behind Butch Vig's drum kit, two Canon XL1 cameras set on tripods (centre and stage-right) were positioned in the balcony, two handheld Canon XL1 cameras (one operated by director LaBarre) were the pit in front of the stage, and a Canon XL1 handheld camera was run by DP Johnson on the stage-left. As of 2020, the full show has not been released though LaBarre still has all the audio and video tapes from the show archived for potential future use.

Opening Acts 

Kelli Ali (Europe – Leg 2)
Abandoned Pools (North America – Leg 3)
White Stripes (Mesa)
Mercury Rev (Europe – Leg 3)
Raphaël (Europe – Leg 3 select dates)
Queen Adreena (Europe – Leg 3 select dates)
The Distillers (North America – Leg 4)
The Superjesus (Australia)

Setlists

For 2001 dates, the Felix da Housecat remix of "Androgyny" heralded the band onstage for the U2 support sets, which debuted Beautiful Garbage album tracks "Androgyny", "Cherry Lips", "Til The Day I Die", "Drive You Home" and "Shut Your Mouth" live onstage, as well as brought back "Silence Is Golden", which was debuted at the end of the Version 2.0 tour in 1999. For the European shows, the set was swollen with the debut of "Breaking Up the Girl" and returning album cuts such as "Not My Idea" and "Supervixen".

In 2002, an intro tape of the instrumental "Noziroh" by hip-hop producer Nobody preceded the band onstage, where they opened with "Push It". Returning album cuts for these dates included "Hammering In My Head" and "Temptation Waits", while also debuting "Cup of Coffee", "Parade", "So Like A Rose" and Version 2.0 b-side "Get Busy With the Fizzy". Cover versions performed throughout 2002 include Rolling Stone's "Wild Horses" and The Ramones' "I Just Want to Have Something to Do", as well as impromptu renditions of Kylie Minogue's "Can't Get You Out of My Head" and "Pipeline" by The Chantays. Two special concerts in London in August 2002 also saw resurrect debut album cut "As Heaven Is Wide", early b-sides "Lick the Pavement" and "Girl Don't Come" as well as perform the obscure "Soldier Through This" for the first time. 

By the end of the run, the only Beautiful Garbage album tracks not performed live at some point were "Can't Cry These Tears", "Nobody Loves You" and "Untouchable". None of the era's b-sides were performed, although a live recording of "Wild Horses" was featured on the "Shut Your Mouth" single and a studio production of "I Just Wanna Have Something To Do" was recorded during the tour for the 2003 various artists album We're a Happy Family: A Tribute to Ramones.

Tour dates 

Festivals and other miscellaneous performances

 Supporting U2 on Elevation tour
 Co-headlining with No Doubt on Rock Steady Tour
 Supporting Red Hot Chili Peppers on By the Way tour

Cancellations and rescheduled shows

Box office score data

Promotional performances

References

External links
Garbage official website

2001 concert tours
2002 concert tours
Garbage (band) concert tours